Lieutenant General Frank William Milburn (January 11, 1892 – October 25, 1962) was a senior United States Army officer who served during World War II and the Korean War.

Military career

Milburn attended the United States Military Academy and was commissioned as a second lieutenant in June 1914. During World War I, Milburn served in the Panama Canal Zone.  Subsequently, Milburn served in a variety of infantry assignments, among them the 5th, 33rd, 15th, and 28th Infantry Regiments.

A 1933 graduate of the Command and General Staff School (the school for higher command in U.S. Army), Milburn was promoted to brigadier general in early 1942 and selected to command the U.S. 83rd Infantry Division in August 1942. He was again promoted in September 1942 to the rank of major general. Milburn commanded the 83rd Division until December 1943, when he took over the newly formed U.S. XXI Corps.

Milburn commanded the XXI Corps for the remainder of World War II in Europe as part of the U.S. Seventh Army under  General Alexander Patch. Milburn's XXI Corps played a decisive role in collapsing the Colmar Pocket in February 1945.

In his The History of the French First Army, General Jean de Lattre de Tassigny described General Milburn in this manner:

When I saw Maj.-Gen. Frank W. Milburn arrive at Rothau at 10.00 on the 25th January, lean and muscular and straight of eye, with the energetic features of a fighter, it did not take me long to know that I would find in him the most careful and loyal of subordinates. The steadfastness of his character, his clear view of realities and his leader-like authority, were apparent to me at once, and I felt that I could have complete confidence in him to bring to a successful conclusion the rough task which was going to fall to his U.S. 21st Army Corps.

Postwar, Milburn's tour of command of the XXI Corps ended in July 1945. Subsequently, Milburn served briefly as the acting commander for the Seventh Army and then the XXIII Corps. Milburn commanded the U.S. V Corps from November 1945 until June 1946. From June 1946 until May 1949, Milburn commanded the U.S. 1st Infantry Division. Promoted to lieutenant general in 1949, Milburn served as the deputy commander of U.S. Army Europe until 1950.

During the Korean War, Milburn temporarily commanded the U.S. IX Corps in August 1950.  From September 1950 until June 1951, Milburn commanded the U.S. I Corps, supervising the invasion of North Korea in October and November 1950.  For two days in December 1950, following the Chinese intervention into the conflict, Milburn was the acting commander of the U.S. Eighth Army until the arrival of General Matthew Ridgway, who was given command of the army after the death of General Walton Walker.

Milburn's career is remarkable for having commanded five corps of the U.S. Army.

He retired from military service in April 1952 and worked briefly as the athletic director at the University of Montana.

Head coaching record

Football

Sources
 Encyclopedia of the Korean War. Spencer C. Tucker, ed. Santa Barbara, ABC-CLIO, 2000.  .
 The History of the French First Army.  Jean de Lattre de Tassigny.  London, George Allen & Unwin Ltd., 1952.
 Riviera to the Rhine.  Jeffrey J. Clarke and Robert Ross Smith.  Washington, Government Printing Office, 1993.
 U.S. Army World War II Corps Commanders.  Robert H. Berlin.  Fort Leavenworth, Command and General Staff College, 1989.

References

External links
Generals of World War II
United States Army Officers 1939–1945

|-

|-

|-

|-

|-

1892 births
1962 deaths
United States Army Infantry Branch personnel
United States Army generals
United States Army personnel of World War I
United States Army personnel of the Korean War
Recipients of the Distinguished Service Medal (US Army)
Recipients of the Silver Star
Recipients of the Legion of Merit
United States Military Academy alumni
Army Black Knights men's ice hockey players
Montana Grizzlies and Lady Griz athletic directors
Montana Grizzlies baseball coaches
Montana Grizzlies football coaches
People from Jasper, Indiana
People from Missoula, Montana
Military personnel from Indiana
United States Army generals of World War II